Charles (or Charlie)  Mackay, McKay, or MacKay may refer to:
 Charles Mackay (author) (1814–1889), Scottish poet, journalist, author, anthologist, novelist, and songwriter
 Charles McKay (1855–1883), American naturalist and explorer
 Charles Mackay (mayor) (1875–1929), New Zealand lawyer, local politician, and Mayor of Wanganui
 Charlie MacKay (1880–1953), Australian rules footballer and physician
 Charles R. Mackay, Australian immunologist, fellow of the Australian Academy of Science
 Charles MacKay (born 1950), American arts administrator